The K7051/7052 Harbin-Daqing Through Train is Chinese railway running between Harbin to Daqing express passenger trains by the Harbin Railway Bureau, Harbin passenger segment responsible for passenger transport task, Habin originating on the Daqing train. 25G Type Passenger trains running along the Binzhou Railway across Heilongjiang provinces, the entire 159 km. Harbin West Railway Station to Daqing Railway Station running 2 hours and 9 minutes, use trips for K7051; Daqing Railway Station to Harbin West Railway Station to run 3 hours and 45 minutes, use trips for K7052.

See also 
6213/6214 Harbin-Daqing Through Train
D7981/7982 Harbin-Daqing Through Train
D7983/7984 Harbin-Daqing Through Train
D7985/7986 Harbin-Daqing Through Train

References 

Passenger rail transport in China
Rail transport in Heilongjiang